Michael Joseph O'Hagan (born 22 January 1878) was an Australian rules footballer who played with St Kilda in the Victorian Football League (VFL).

Family
The son of John O'Hagan (1845-1882), and Mary Ann O'Hagan (-1891), née Creed, Michael Joseph O'Hagan was born in Carlton, Victoria on 22 January 1878.

Education
He was educated at the Christian Brothers College, in Victoria Parade.

In 1895, he was studying pharmacy at the University of Melbourne.

Football
He played VFL football for St Kilda on one occasion, against Essendon, at the East Melbourne Cricket Ground, on 24 July 1897 — Essendon thrashed St Kilda 13.16 (94) to 0.3 (3).

Footnotes

References 
Holmesby, Russell & Main, Jim (2014). The Encyclopedia of AFL Footballers: every AFL/VFL player since 1897 (10th ed.), (Seaford), BAS Publishing.

External links 

Year of death missing
1878 births
Australian rules footballers from Melbourne
St Kilda Football Club players
People from Carlton, Victoria